"Come Down, O Love Divine" is a Christian hymn usually sung for the festival of Pentecost. It makes reference to the descent of the Holy Spirit as an invocation to God to come to into the soul of the believer. It is a popular piece of Anglican church music and is commonly sung to the tune "Down Ampney" by Ralph Vaughan Williams.

History
The text of "Come down, O Love divine" originated as an Italian poem, "Discendi amor santo" by the medieval mystic poet Bianco da Siena (1350-1399). The poem appeared in the 1851 collection Laudi Spirituali del Bianco da Siena of Telesforo Bini, and in 1861, the Anglo-Irish clergyman and writer Richard Frederick Littledale translated it into English. The first publication of the English version was in Littledale's 1867 hymn-book, The People's Hymnal.

For the hymn's publication in The English Hymnal of 1906, the hymnal's editor Ralph Vaughan Williams composed a tune, "Down Ampney", which he named after the Gloucestershire village of his birth. This publication established the hymn's widespread popularity. When Vaughan Williams died in 1958, "Come Down, O Love Divine" was sung at his funeral in Westminster Abbey as the composer's ashes were ceremonially interred in the Musicians' Corner.

Text

Come down, O Love divine, 
seek thou this soul of mine, 
and visit it with thine own ardor glowing; 
O Comforter, draw near, 
within my heart appear, 
and kindle it, thy holy flame bestowing.

O let it freely burn
till earthly passions turn
to dust and ashes in its heat consuming;
and let thy glorious light
shine ever on my sight,
and clothe me round, the while my path illuming.

Let holy charity
mine outward vesture be,
and lowliness become my inner clothing;
true lowliness of heart
which takes the humbler part,
and o'er its own shortcomings weeps with loathing.

And so the yearning strong
with which the soul will long
shall far surpass the power of human telling;
for none can guess its grace
till we become the place
wherein the Holy Spirit makes his dwelling.

Tune
The following setting of the tune appears in The English Hymnal (1906):

References

Citations

Sources

See also
Veni Creator Spiritus

English Christian hymns
Hymns for Pentecost
Songs based on poems
20th-century hymns
Compositions by Ralph Vaughan Williams
1906 in Christianity
1906 in music
Hymns in The English Hymnal
14th-century hymns